Old Adobe Barn, also known as Adobe Post Office, is a historic barn in La Grange, California. It is the oldest building in the town being built prior to 1850 by the first French settlers in the area. It was used as a post office. The barn is made of adobe bricks on the side walls, and of wooden planks on the southern facade.

References

Barns on the National Register of Historic Places in California
Buildings and structures in Stanislaus County, California
National Register of Historic Places in Stanislaus County, California